Events in the year 2023 in Jamaica.

Incumbents 

 Monarch: Charles III
 Governor-General: Patrick Allen
 Prime Minister: Andrew Holness
 Chief Justice: Bryan Sykes

Events 
Ongoing — COVID-19 pandemic in Jamaica

 1 February – Jamaican Prime Minister Andrew Holness says that his government is willing to send troops to Haiti as part of a "multinational security assistance deployment".

Deaths 

 4 January – Richard Bernal, diplomat and economist.

References 

 
2020s in Jamaica
Years of the 21st century in Jamaica
Jamaica
Jamaica